Wilson Hills is a group of scattered hills, nunataks and ridges that extend NW-SE for about  between Matusevich Glacier and Pryor Glacier in Antarctica. They were discovered by Lieutenant Harry Pennell, Royal Navy, on the Terra Nova Expedition in February 1911 during Robert Falcon Scott's last expedition, and named after Edward Adrian Wilson, a zoologist with the expedition, who perished with Scott on the return journey from the South Pole.

Geological features

Axthelm Ridge 

Axthelm Ridge is a narrow ridge, 4 miles (6 km) long, 1.5 miles (2.4 km) southeast of Parkinson Peak. Mapped by United States Geological Survey (USGS) from surveys and U.S. Navy air photos, 1960–63. Named by Advisory Committee on Antarctic Names (US-ACAN) for Commander Charles E. Axthelm, U.S. Navy, Flag Secretary to the Commander of the U.S. Naval Support Force, Antarctica, during Operation Deep Freeze 1969 and 1970; executive officer on the USS Glacier during Operation Deep Freeze 1965 and 1966.

Mount Ellery 

The region was photographed by U.S. Navy Operation Highjump, 1946–47. The position of the mountain was fixed on February 21, 1962, by Sydney L. Kirkby, surveyor with the ANARE (Australian National Antarctic Research Expeditions) Thala Dan cruise led by Phillip Law. Named for Robert L. J. Ellery, a member of the Austratian Antarctic Exploration Committee of 1886.

Exiles Nunataks 
 

Exiles Nunataks is a cluster of small nunataks 8 miles (13 km) south-southwest of DeRemer Nunataks. Mapped by USGS from surveys and U.S. Navy air photos, 1960–63. So named by the northern party of the New Zealand Geological Survey Antarctic Expedition (NZGSAE), 1963–64, because of their isolated position.

Mount Steele 

Mapped by USGS from surveys and U.S. Navy air photos, 1960–63. Named by Advisory Committee on Antarctic Names (US-ACAN) for Carlett D. Steele, Chief Aviation Machinist's Mate of Squadron VX-6. Steele participated in several Deep Freeze operations between 1957 and 1968 as helicopter crew member and maintenance supervisor.

See also
Bourgeois Nunataks
Burt Rocks
Celestial Peak
Heth Ridge
Mount Blowaway
Mount Send
Schmehl Peak

References

Nunataks of Oates Land
Hills of Oates Land
Ridges of Oates Land